Fairbank may refer to:

People
 Fairbank (surname)

Places 
 67235 Fairbank, asteroid

United States
 Fairbank, Arizona
 Fairbank, Iowa
 Fairbank Township, Buchanan County, Iowa
 Fairbank Island (Michigan)

Canada
 Fairbank, Newfoundland and Labrador
 Fairbank, Toronto, Ontario - a neighbourhood in Toronto in which the following are located:
 Fairbank Memorial Park
 Fairbank Middle School
 Fairbank station - an underground light-rail station on Line 5 Eglinton
 Fairbank Island (Fairbank Lake), Northern Ontario
 Fairbank Lake, Northern Ontario

Other uses 
 Fairbank's disease, or multiple epiphyseal dysplasia, a genetic disorder

See also 

 
 
 Fairbanks, Alaska
 Fairbanks (disambiguation)